Nong Chik is a district (amphoe) in Pattani province, southern Thailand.

History
Nong Chik was one of the seven states (mueang) into which the Pattani Kingdom was split in the early-19th century to diminish the power of the often rebellious tributary kingdom. The capital was put in tambon Nong Mai (Yarang District). In 1901 the district office was moved to Tu Yong, where it remains.

Due to the district office location in Tu Yong, the district was renamed "Tu Yong" in 1917. In 1938 it was again renamed "Nong Chik".

Geography
Neighboring districts are (from the east clockwise): Mueang Pattani, Yarang, Mae Lan, and Khok Pho of Pattani Province; and Thepha of Songkhla province. To the north is the Gulf of Thailand.

Economy
Nong Chik is the center of the two year-old Orangpantai Fishing Enterprise (literally, 'sea gypsy company'). It is a cooperative that specializes in the catch, preparation, and sale of preserved fish. Its specialty is salted four-finger threadfins, locally known as plaa kulao, as well as salted spotted mackerel or plaa insee, dried squid, and smooth-textured shrimp paste.

The majority of its members belong to the Pattani Provincial Small-Scale Fisher Network Association, which works with local fishermen to conserve marine resources. Association members have one important rule—they must refrain from using destructive fishing gear and nets that trap juvenile fish as by-catch. The enforcement of this rule has caused fish stocks in the area to rebound.

Administration

Central administration 
Nong Chik is divided into 12 sub-districts (tambons), which are further subdivided into 76 administrative villages (mubans).

Local administration 
There are two sub-district municipalities (thesaban tambons) in the district:
 Bo Thong consisting of sub-district Bo Thong and parts of sub-district Bang Khao.
 Nong Chik consisting of parts of sub-district Tuyong.

There are 11 subdistrict administrative organizations (SAO) in the district:
 Ko Po consisting of sub-district Ko Po.
 Kholo Tanyong consisting of sub-district Kholo Tanyong.
 Don Rak consisting of sub-district Don Rak.
 Dato consisting of sub-district Dato.
 Tuyong consisting of parts of sub-district Tuyong.
 Tha Kamcham consisting of sub-district Tha Kamcham.
 Bang Khao consisting of parts of sub-district Bang Khao.
 Bang Tawa consisting of sub-district Bang Tawa.
 Pulo Puyo consisting of sub-district Pulo Puyo.
 Yabi consisting of sub-district Yabi.
 Lipa Sa-ngo consisting of sub-district Lipa Sa-ngo.

References

External links
amphoe.com (Thai)
http://www.nongjik.blogspot.com/ Official blog of the district office

Districts of Pattani province
Former provinces of Thailand